Manga! Manga! The World of Japanese Comics is a 1983 book by Frederik L. Schodt. Published by the Japanese publisher Kodansha, it was the first substantial English-language work on Japanese comics, or manga, as an artistic, literary, commercial and sociological phenomenon. Part of Schodt's motivation for writing it was to introduce manga to English speakers.  The book is copiously illustrated and features a foreword by Osamu Tezuka. It also includes translated excerpts from Tezuka's Phoenix, Keiji Nakazawa's Barefoot Gen, and Riyoko Ikeda's The Rose of Versailles, and the Reiji Matsumoto short story "Ghost Warrior".

Manga! Manga! was enthusiastically reviewed in the mainstream and comics press and received a prominent endorsement from Stan Lee.

In 1996, Stone Bridge Press published Schodt's "sequel" to Manga! Manga!, Dreamland Japan: Writings on Modern Manga. In the introduction to this book, Schodt states that a Japanese bistro in Berkeley, California took its name from Manga! Manga!

Contents
 Foreword by Osamu Tezuka
 A Thousand Million Manga
 Themes and Readers
 Reading, and the Structure of Narrative Comics
 Why Japan?
 A Thousand Years of Manga
 The Comic Art Tradition
 Western Styles
 Safe and Unsafe Art
 Comics and the War Machine
 The Phoenix Becomes a Godzilla
 The Spirit of Japan
 Paladins of the Past
 Modern-Day Warriors
 Samurai Sports
 Flowers and Dreams
 Picture Poems
 Women Artists Take Over
 Sophisticated Ladies
 The Economic Animal at Work and at Play
 Pride and Craftsmanship
 Mr. Lifetime Salary-Man
 Mah Jongg Wizards
 Regulation versus Fantasy
 Is There Nothing Sacred?
 Social and Legal Restraints
 Erotic Comics
 The Comics Industry
 Artists
 Publishers
 Profits
 The Future
 The New Visual Generation
 Challenges for the Industry
 First Japan, Then the World?

Notes

External links
 

1983 non-fiction books
Books about manga
Kodansha books